NA-134 Kasur-IV is a newly created constituency for the National Assembly of Pakistan. It mainly consists of Chunian Tehsil and includes areas of the Tehsil which were previously included in the now-abolished Constituency NA-140. It also includes some Qanungo Halkas from Pattoki Tehsil – namely, Chak no. 34, Chakoki, and Wan Adhan.

Members of Parliament

2018-2022: NA-139 Kasur-III

Election 2018 

General elections were held on 25 July 2018.

See also
NA-133 Kasur-III
NA-135 Okara-I

References 

Kasur